The 1990 World Sportscar Championship season was the 38th season of FIA World Sportscar Championship racing.  It featured the 1990 FIA World Sports-Prototype Championship for Drivers and the 1990 FIA World Sports-Prototype Championship for Teams, both of which were contested over a series for cars running under the FIA's Group C formula.  The series ran from 8 April 1990 to 7 October 1990 and was composed of nine races.

Schedule

Entries

Results and standings

Race results
The Montreal race was stopped before 75% distance was completed, therefore half points were awarded.

In order to be classified for points, a team had to complete 75% of the winner's distance.  Further, drivers were required to complete at least 30% of their car's total race distance to qualify for championship points.

Drivers' World Championship

Teams' World Championship

See also

1990 24 Hours of Le Mans, a race for Group C Sports Prototypes which did not count towards the 1990 World Sports-Prototype Championship.

External links
 Points table for the 1990 World Sports-Prototype Championship for Drivers Retrieved from wspr-racing.com on 7 February 1990
 Points table for the 1990 World Sports-Prototype Championship for Teams Retrieved from wspr-racing.com on 7 February 1990
 1990 World Sports-Prototype Championship - round results
 Round 3 photos: Silverstone
 Round 5 photos: Dijon-Prenois
 Round 7 photos: Donington Park
 Round 8 photos: Montreal

 
World Sportscar Championship seasons
Sports